Leomir Silva Teles, better known as Careca (born 17 August 1989), is a Brazilian footballer who currently plays as a striker for Esporte Clube Águia Negra.

Career
Born in Campo Grande, Mato Grosso do Sul, he started his career at age 17 with Esporte Clube Bahia in the same year he moved to Cene, where he played his first major trophy, the Brazilian Cup

Despite failing to help the club in a good position, he was one of the highlights of the team. In 2007, the Bahia is hired where there is very leveraged and remains in Bahia club until the end of the year.

Back to football in Campo Grande, now the Black Eagle, Bald stood out in South Matogrossense Championship of 2008 when he made 17 goals in 13 games.

The young striker was also well in the Brazil Cup 2008, scoring four goals in two games and drew the attention of the Corinthians, who brought you to the Parque São Jorge.

Careca played in the Nacional (SP) on loan from Corinthians Paulista.

Career statistics
(Correct )

References

External links
 WebSoccerClub 
 CBF 

1989 births
Living people
Brazilian footballers
Association football forwards
Esporte Clube Bahia players
Sport Club Corinthians Paulista players
Esporte Clube Noroeste players
Associação Desportiva São Caetano players
Red Bull Brasil players
Nacional Atlético Clube (SP) players
Atlético Monte Azul players
Comercial Futebol Clube (Ribeirão Preto) players
Paysandu Sport Club players
People from Campo Grande
Sportspeople from Mato Grosso do Sul